A cancer survivor is a person with cancer of any type who is still living. Whether a person becomes a survivor at the time of diagnosis or after completing treatment, whether people who are actively dying are considered survivors, and whether healthy friends and family members of the cancer patient are also considered survivors, varies from group to group. Some people who have been diagnosed with cancer reject the term survivor or disagree with some definitions of it.

How many people are cancer survivors depends on the definition used. Nearly 65% of adults diagnosed with cancer in the developed world are expected to live at least five years after the cancer is discovered. In the U.S. for example, about 11 million Americans alive today—one in 30 people–are either currently undergoing treatment for cancer or have done so in the past.

Many cancer survivors describe the process of living with and beating cancer as a life-changing experience. It is not uncommon for survivors to use the experience as opportunities for creative self-transformation into a "better person" or as motivation to meet goals of great personal importance, such as climbing a mountain or reconciling with an estranged family member. This process of posttraumatic growth is called benefit finding. Cancer survivors often have specific medical and non-medical needs related to their cancer experience.

Definitions and alternatives
Macmillan Cancer Support in the UK defines a cancer survivor as someone who is "living with or beyond cancer", namely someone who:
 has completed initial cancer management and has no apparent evidence of active disease;
 is living with progressive disease and may be receiving cancer treatment, but is not in the terminal phases of illness;
 or has had cancer in the past.

The National Coalition for Cancer Survivorship (NCCS) pioneered the definition of survivor as being any person diagnosed with cancer, from the time of initial diagnosis until his or her death. This definition of "survivor" includes people who are dying from untreatable cancer. NCCS later expanded the definition of survivor even further to include family, friends and voluntary caregivers who are "impacted by the survivorship experience" in any way. The US National Cancer Institute's Office of Cancer Survivorship uses a variant of this expanded definition.

The word survivor is a loaded term. Within the breast cancer culture, survivorship is conferred upon women and men who are perceived as having had emotional or physical trauma, even if their breast cancer was a non-life-threatening pre-cancerous condition like LCIS or DCIS. The term tends to erase and degrade people who are dying of incurable cancer. This idea of survivorship emphasizes and values longevity of life after diagnosis, while overlooking issues of quality of life.

Some people reject the term survivor as being a narrow conceptualization of highly variable human experiences. Alternatives include alivers and thrivers, which put emphasis on living as well as possible, despite limitations and disability. A third term, the diers, is used by some terminally ill patients who reject the claim that dying is part of survivorship or should be covered up with inappropriately optimistic language.

The term previvor has been used to describe unaffected carriers. Unaffected carriers, or previvors, are those who have not been diagnosed with cancer, but who know that they are likely to develop cancer due to certain genetic mutations that form a known cancer syndrome. They have survived the predisposition, or higher risk, of cancer. As such, this is the first generation in human history who, armed with information about a predisposition to a cancer after opting into DNA testing, can make informed choices prior to cancer diagnosis. The typical previvor has tested positive for a BRCA mutation, learned that she is at high risk for developing breast cancer and ovarian cancer, and is attempting to manage that risk through a combination of increased surveillance through mammograms, breast MRIs, pelvic ultrasounds, oophorectomy, bilateral mastectomy, and other medical procedures. There has been much controversy over the term previvor, due to the fact that the name compares these healthy women to people who have already been diagnosed with cancer.

Needs of cancer survivors
People who have finished cancer treatment often have psychological and physical medical challenges. These effects can vary from person to person, change over time, and range in intensity from mild and intermittent to fully disabling. They commonly include fatigue, pain, sleep problems, physical side effects like lymphoedema, weight gain, anxiety and depression, fear of cancer recurrence, and impaired quality of life.

Psychosocial

Returning to life
If the treatment is lengthy and disruptive, many patients experience some difficulty in returning to normal daily life. The energy needed to cope with a rigorous treatment program may have caused them to disconnect from previous daily patterns, such as working, normal self-care, and housekeeping. Some survivors become dependent on the attention and sympathy that they received during their treatment and feel neglected when life returns to normal. There are tremendous implications that cancer has on the relationships that survivors have with their loved ones (particularly their partners) once their cancer has been treated, and social support plays a critical role in their long-term emotional adjustment.

Cancer survivors tend to be more resilient than the general population.

Ongoing effects
Some survivors have to adjust to the idea that they will never be cured.

Some survivors, even if the cancer has been permanently cured, struggle emotionally from the trauma of having experienced a life-threatening disease. Cancer survivors experience more psychological distress than those who have never had cancer (5.6% compared to 3.0%) Serious psychological distress was seen 40% more among cancer survivors of five years or more than in those who have never had cancer. About 10% develop major depressive disorder; others experience an adjustment disorder. In young adult cancer survivors, one small study found that 20% of participants met the full clinical diagnosis of post-traumatic stress disorder (PTSD), and 45% to 95% displayed at least one symptom of PTSD. Survivors of adult cancer are at an increased risk of suicidal ideation (having thoughts about suicide), while as many as 13% of childhood cancer survivors experience suicidal ideation. Issues of pain and physical ailments have been hypothesized as major contributing factors in cancer survivors experiencing this suicidal ideation.

Fear of cancer recurrence
Patients whose cancer is in remission may still have to cope with the uncertainty that at any time their cancer could return without warning. After the initial treatment has ended, anxiety is more common among cancer survivors than among other people. This anxiety regarding the cancer's return is referred to as fear of cancer recurrence. Many patients are anxious that any minor symptom indicates that the cancer has returned, with as many as 9 in 10 patients fearful that their cancer will recur or spread. In addition to the appearance of any new aches and pains, common triggers for a fear that the cancer may return include hearing that someone else has been diagnosed with cancer, annual medical exams to determine whether the cancer recurred, and news stories about cancer. This anxiety leads to more medical check ups, which can be measured even after a period of up to ten years. This fear can have a significant effect on individuals' lives, resulting in difficulties in their daily life such as work and socialising, and difficulties planning for the future. Overall, fear of cancer recurrence is related to a reduced quality of life in cancer survivors.

While Fear of Cancer Recurrence (FCR) can be adaptive at low levels, high levels of FCR require psychological treatment. At present, there are no psychometrically sound measures of FCR, which makes research into the effectiveness of treatment protocols difficult to interpret. Treatments that are being investigated include: cognitive-behavioural therapy, meta-cognitive therapy, cognitive-existential group therapy, mindfulness-based interventions, and physical exercise.

Survivorship
The cultural ideal of a survivor may add to individual patients' distress if the patient is unable or unwilling to live up to the ideal. As described by Gayle Sulik in her book Pink Ribbon Blues: How Breast Cancer Culture Undermines Women's Health, the ideal survivor is bravely committed to mainstream medicine and optimistic or even certain of a physical cure. She is open about diagnosis and treatment and become an educated, empowered medical consumer. The ideal survivor, like a superwoman who simultaneously manages her home, family, and career, struggles valiantly to prevent cancer from affecting loved ones by appearing, behaving, and working as much as possible. Once the immediate crisis is past, the person may feel strongly pressured to donate time, money, and energy to cancer-related organizations. Above all, the ideal survivor does not die of cancer. People who publicly conform to this ideal are given social status and respect.

Physical
In terms of medical challenges, some survivors experience cancer-related fatigue, may have long-term side effects from cancer and its treatment, and may need extensive rehabilitation for mobility and function if aggressive surgery was required to remove the cancer. They may experience temporary or persistent post-chemotherapy cognitive impairment. Some young survivors lose their ability to have children.

Cancer survivors frequently need medical monitoring, and some treatments for unrelated diseases in the future may be contraindicated. For example, a patient who has had a significant amount of radiation therapy may not be a good candidate for more radiation treatments in the future. To assist with these needs, "survivor care plans" have been promoted. These are personalized documents that describe the person's diagnosis and treatment in detail, list common known side effects, and specifically outline the steps that the survivor should take in the future, ranging from maintaining a healthy weight to receiving specific medical tests on a stated schedule.

Medical tests to determine whether the cancer has returned commonly provoke fears. Informally, this is called scanxiety, a portmanteau of scan and anxiety. A desire to avoid feeling this fear can prompt survivors to postpone or refuse tests. This may be able to be helped by the follow up of people who have had cancer post-treatment being undertaken via self-reported patient-related outcome measures rather than follow-up visits, but there is not enough controlled research looking into this.

Survivors of childhood cancer have a life expectancy up to 28% shorter than people in the general population. Therefore, there is a need to closely monitor these patients for much longer than usual. The Children's Oncology Group recommends that monitoring should include periodic follow up and screening by a clinician familiar with these patients' risks. Improving these patients' longevity requires recognition and treatment of illnesses associated with late effects in the decades after therapy for childhood cancer. For example, survivors of childhood cancer may have more difficulty than typical with breastfeeding and require more support to undertake this health-promoting activity. Childhood cancer survivors are also at risk for developing kidney diseases. Others experience various forms of heart disease. One challenge to achieving this goal is that childhood cancer survivors are both very adaptable and accustomed to denying difficulties; as a result, they tend to minimize their symptoms. Therefore, internists may not give them all the attention they need and thus the actual help they may need. Symptom management, health promotion, specific attention to psychosocial needs, and surveillance for recurrence and specific late effects of treatment are helpful. Health behaviour interventions may be able to reduce the impact of some of the chronic issues cancer survivors face by improving their dietary intake. Likewise, physical exercise training interventions may have positive effects on physical fitness, including cardio-respiratory fitness, muscle strength and health-related quality of life.

Adolescent and young adult survivors
Adolescent and young adult (AYA) survivors, often defined as being between the ages of 15 and 39, have seen advancements in technology and modern medicine causing a dramatic increase in the number of AYA survivors. Prior to 1970, childhood cancer was considered a universally fatal disease. From 1995 to 2000, however, the 5-year survival rate for children diagnosed with cancer was 80%. Significant progress has been built in the last 25 years as there are now approximately 270,000 survivors of pediatric cancer in the U.S., which translates to approximately 1 in every 640 young adults being a survivor of childhood cancer. However, as studies have shown, as patient needs increase, the likelihood of having an unmet need also increases. For the AYA population, 2 out of 3 childhood cancer survivors will develop a complication due to the therapy they received, and 1 out of 3 will develop serious or life-threatening complications, meaning they will need treatment and follow-up care. In addition, AYAs may experience greater difficulties adhering to treatment, which may negatively impact future outcomes.

An AYA survivor faces a variety of issues as a result of their cancer diagnosis and treatment that are unique to their particular age group which differentiate their survivor population from the adult survivor population. For example, AYA survivors report that their education, employment, sexual functioning, marriage, fertility, and other life values are impacted by their cancer. Compared to adult survivors, AYA survivors have a much greater risk of getting a second primary malignancy as a side effect of the treatment for their original diagnosis. It is believed that AYAs have a much higher relative risk of developing a second primary cancer because the intensity of the treatment for their original diagnosis, typically including any combination of chemotherapy, surgery, and radiation therapy, is much higher than the level of intensity given to patients over 40. Furthermore, since AYA survivors are diagnosed and treated at such a young age, their length of time as a survivor is much longer than their adult counterparts, making it more likely they will face a second primary cancer in their lifetime.

Barriers to quality long-term follow-up care
Childhood cancer survivors, in particular, need comprehensive long-term follow-up care to thrive. One way this can be accomplished is through continuous follow-up care with a primary care physician who is trained to identify possible late effects from previous treatments and therapies.

The Children's Oncology Group (COG) has designed a set of survivorship guidelines that hope to aid both health care professionals and survivors themselves, in both the intricacies and basics of long-term follow-up care. The COG recommends that patients or their families put together their own treatment summary, so they can have their treatment history with them when they visit any health care provider. The COG suggests that all survivors include the following in their treatment summaries:
Name of disease, date of diagnosis, stage of disease, contact information of all clinics and hospitals where care was received
Names and doses of any chemotherapy received
Names and doses of any radiation received, and the area of the body that was radiated
Names and dates of all surgeries
For people receiving a transplant, the type of transplant, where it was received, and whether chronic graft-versus-host disease developed
Names and dates of any significant complications and treatment received for those complications

With the treatment summary, experts hope that survivors will be better equipped to maintain quality follow-up care long after their original treatment. This is especially important for the AYA population, in particular, because they are typically facing major social changes regarding their relationship status, employment or education status, their insurance coverage, and even their place of residence, etc. Typically, most of these factors are stable for most older adults, and when they experience any changes, it would usually occur in one or two aspects of their life at a time. However, with people under the age of 40 is when most people undergo the most change. This reality underscores the importance of a smooth transition from child-centered to adult-focused health care services through which they are consistently managed.

Impact of Affordable Care Act on the AYA survivor population
The US Affordable Care Act (ACA) in 2010 makes it illegal for health insurance providers to deny coverage for a pre-existing condition, such as previously having survived cancer. Young adults are required to have health insurance coverage and, with a few exceptions, will be able to be covered under their parent's coverage until the age of 26 as a dependent in their parent's plan.

Care 
Studies among endometrial cancer survivors show that satisfaction with information provided about the disease and treatment increases the quality of life, lowers depression and results in less anxiety. People who receive information on paper, compared to oral, indicate that they receive more information and are more satisfied about the information provided. The US Institute of Medicine and the Dutch Health Council recommend the use of a written "survivorship care plan", which is a summary of a patient's course of treatment, with recommendations for subsequent surveillance, management of late effects, and strategies for health promotion.

Cancer survivors are encouraged to meet the same guidelines for physical activity as the rest of the population. However, less than one-third of US cancer survivors met the Physical Activity Guideline for Americans. Increased physical activity reduces both all-cause and cancer-specific mortality in breast and colorectal cancer survivors as well as all cancer survivors. In addition, sedentary behaviors, particularly prolonged sitting, were associated with worse survival outcomes. Physical activity improves quality of life among a range of cancer survivors and may also assist with cancer-related fatigue and common co-morbidities.

Diet can also impact long-term mortality, with evidence across various cancer types.

However, adherence to diet and exercise recommendations among cancer survivors is often poor.

Digital behaviour change interventions can be successful at increasing physical activity and may also help with diet in cancer survivors.

In breast cancer survivors, home-based multidimensional survivorship programmes have short-term beneficial impacts on quality of life and can reduce anxiety, fatigue and insomnia. Mindfulness-based survivorship programs may be an effective way to improve the mental health of cancer survivors.

Family members
Family members can be significantly affected by the cancer experience of their loved ones. For parents of children with cancer, finishing treatment can be a particularly vulnerable time. In the post-treatment period, some parents may experience increases in anxiety, depression and feelings of helplessness. A sub-group of parents report post-traumatic stress symptoms up to years after treatment completion. Evidence-based psychological interventions tailored to the needs of parents of childhood cancer survivors may assist parents in resuming their normal lives after their child has finished treatment.

Spouses of cancer survivors are more likely than other people to experience anxiety in the years after their partner's successful treatment.  Being married reduces the cancer survivor's risk of developing post-traumatic stress disorder or other psychological difficulties, but it increases the risk of the spouse developing mental health symptoms.

See also 
Learning problems in childhood cancer
Psycho-oncology

Notes

References

External links 

 Information about survivorship at Cancer.Net by the American Society of Clinical Oncology
 National Coalition for Cancer Survivorship

Oncology